Ramite is a 2021 Nepali novel by Jason Kunwar. It was published on February 13, 2021 by Red Panda Books. It is debut book of the author who is a musician and a part of a band called 'Night'. The book was shortlisted for the Madan Puraskar.

The book is a part a project consisting of four sections. The future installments will be in musical performances, arts and films. The project is a collaboration between various musicians, artists, photographers, illustrators and filmmakers.

Synopsis 
The novel is set in a fictional world, and has been told by multiple narrators. It consists of various songs, sketches and fictional scripts. The book depicts the story of human civilization, societies and various human instincts that mirrors our world.

Reception 
The book was shortlisted for Madan Puraskar, 2077 BS alongside Eklavya Ko Debre Haat by Giri Shreesh Magar, Kariya by Krishna Abiral, Kalpa Grantha by Kumar Nagarkoti, Nrityakshar Vigyan by Bhairab Bahadur Thapa, Filingo by Prabha Baral, Fulange by Lekhnath Chettri, Mokshabhumi by Keshav Dahal, and Limbuwan Ko Etihasik Dastawej Sangrah by Bhagi Raj Ingnam.

Release 
The book was launched on February 13, 2021 in Patan Museum located in Patan Durbar Square. Kunwar's band Night and some other artists performed during the launch event.

See also 

 Mokshabhumi
 Limbuwanko Etihasik Dastavej Sangraha
 Pagal Basti

References

External links 

 Official website of the book

21st-century Nepalese novels
2021 Nepalese novels
Nepalese novels
Nepali-language novels
Nepalese books
21st-century Nepalese books
2021 debut novels
Novels with multiple narrators